These are the complete results achieved by Porsche cars and engines in Formula One, including Formula Two races that were held concurrently.

World Championship results

Works team entries
(key)

Results of other Porsche cars
(key)

Notes
  – Indicates a race entered with an F2 car.
  – The Constructors World Championship did not exist before .

As an engine supplier
(key)

Non-championship Formula One results
(key)

Formula One constructor results
Porsche in motorsport